Intersex people in Canada have no recognition of their rights to physical integrity and bodily autonomy, and no specific protections from discrimination on the basis of sex characteristics. Academic advocates including Janik Bastien-Charlebois and Morgan Holmes, and organizations including Egale Canada and the Canadian Bar Association have called for reform.

Physical integrity and bodily autonomy 

The definition of aggravated assault under Section 268 of the Criminal Code contains an exemption that explicitly permits surgical interventions to modify the characteristics of individuals to make them appear more typical:

For Intersex Awareness Day in October 2018, Egale Canada published a statement calling on the Canadian government to protect the rights of intersex persons, fulfilling "treaty body obligations under international law," and accompanied by a submission to the UN Committee Against Torture. The statement referred to Criminal Code [s. 268(3)], stating that it "allows for parents and medical practitioners to undertake nonconsensual, cosmetic surgeries on intersex infants". Egale called on the Canadian government to:

In May 2019, the Canadian Bar Association called on the government to amend the Criminal Code, "to postpone genital normalizing surgeries on children until the child can meaningfully participate in the decision – except where there is immediate risk to the child's health and medical treatment cannot be delayed."

On June 15, 2021, Egale Canada filed an application to the Ontario Superior Court of Justice challenging the constitutionality of Section 268(3)(a) of the Criminal Code.

Identification documents

All individuals (intersex or not) with non-binary gender can obtain Canadian passports with an "X" sex descriptor.

Marriage
Since the passing of the Civil Marriage Act in 2005, marriage has been defined as "the lawful union of two persons to the exclusion of all others."

Rights advocacy

Notable intersex rights advocates in Canada include Janik Bastien-Charlebois and Morgan Holmes.

See also
Intersex human rights
LGBT rights in Canada
Transgender rights in Canada

References

Bibliography
 
 
 
 
 
 

 
Human rights in Canada
LGBT rights in Canada